Sagarana: The Duel is a 1973 Brazilian adventure drama film directed by Paulo Thiago, based on the short story "O Duelo" by João Guimarães Rosa. It was entered into the 24th Berlin International Film Festival.

Cast
 Joel Barcellos as Turíbio
 Milton Moraes as Cassiano
 Ítala Nandi as Mariana
 Rodolfo Arena as Exaltino
 Ana Maria Magalhães
 Paulo César Peréio
 Zózimo Bulbul
 Sadi Cabral as Habrão
 Paulo Villaça as Elias Ruivo
 Wilson Grey
 Átila Iório as Titão Passos
 Luiz Linhares
 Vinícius Salvatori
 Joffre Soares as Cara de Bronze

References

External links

1973 Western (genre) films
1973 films
Brazilian Western (genre) films
Films based on short fiction
Films based on works by João Guimarães Rosa
Films directed by Paulo Thiago
Films scored by Antônio Carlos Jobim
1970s Portuguese-language films